The Show-Off is a 1946 film directed by Harry Beaumont based on the play of the same name by George Kelly. It stars Red Skelton and Marilyn Maxwell. It was previously filmed in 1926 as The Show-Off starring Ford Sterling, Lois Wilson and Louise Brooks and in 1934 as The Show-Off with Spencer Tracy and Madge Evans. Lois Wilson also appeared in the 1934 version, but in a different role.

Plot
Amy Fisher's parents can't understand what their daughter sees in Aubrey Piper, a loudmouth and braggart who pretends to be more than the lowly clerk he is.

She marries Aubrey even though he can't seem to stop insulting others or interfering with their lives. He accidentally sets her inventor brother Joe's laboratory on fire and also wrecks a car, driving it without a license. He is kicked off a radio show for offending the sponsor and blows Joe's deal with a paint company by demanding the inventor be paid $100,000.

Things go from bad to worse as Amy and Aubrey move in with her parents. In the end, though, a change of heart from the paint company's boss seals Joe's deal and Aubrey gets the credit, pleasing everyone.

Cast
Red Skelton as J. Aubrey Piper
Marilyn Maxwell as Amy Fisher Piper
Marjorie Main as Mrs. Fisher
Marshall Thompson as Joe
Virginia O'Brien as Hortense
Eddie 'Rochester' Anderson as Eddie

Crew
David Townsend - Art Director

Reception
The film earned $1,928,000 in the US and Canada and $451,000 elsewhere resulting in a profit of $723,000.

Radio adaptations
The Show-Off was presented on Lux Radio Theater in 1935 starring Joe E. Brown and 1943 starring Harold "Great Gildersleeve" Peary, Una Merkel, and Beulah Bondi, with slightly altered plot lines.  Theatre Guild on the Air presented a one-hour adaptation on  February 22, 1953 starring Paul Douglas and Jan Sterling.

References

External links

The Show-Off at Red-Skelton

1946 films
Films directed by Harry Beaumont
Metro-Goldwyn-Mayer films
1946 comedy films
American films based on plays
Films with screenplays by George Wells
American black-and-white films
American comedy films
1940s American films
1940s English-language films